"First Taste of Gone" is a song co-written and recorded by Canadian country artist Josh Ross. He co-wrote the track with Mason Thornley, while Matt Geroux produced it. The song was initially released independently before Ross signed with The Core Entertainment and Universal Music Canada, who took over promotion of the single.

Background
On a Monday night, Ross learned that his producer had become unavailable for the next two days due to contracting COVID-19. As a result, he pushed his recording session that was slated for a different song to the Thursday that week. That night, he and co-writer Mason Thornley elected to write a new song with their newfound time and decided to pursue the title "First Taste of Gone", which they had attempted to use earlier that year. They wrote the song in 45 minutes, which Ross stated was much quicker than usual for him.

Ross co-wrote the song at a time in his life where he was "going through a lot" with many changes in his personal life. He cited thinking of "that moment where you have to go out again without that person," and having a "weird feeling" thinking "'well, I don’t have to call someone when I go home tonight' or 'she's not going to be there.'" On social media platform TikTok, he revealed that the song was inspired by a girl he was previously with, and the moment he realized she was not coming back. He stated that he felt the song showcased a different side of him, "emotionally and vocally", to his listeners.

Critical reception
Erica Zisman of CountrySwag favourably reviewed "First Taste of Gone", calling it a "heartbreaker" that "depicts the feelings we all go through when we finally get to the point, where a relationship is truly over". She described it as Ross' first "true ballad," adding that it "has everything a song needs to stand the test of time," and "fans would fall in love with [it]". Jenna Weishar of Front Porch Music stated that the track "captures the heartbreak element", positively noting that it could have taken a bigger instrumental angle, but instead, "the broken down simplicity of the piano and raw vocal just drives the story so thoughtfully". Nick Tressler of Raised Rowdy stated that the song could provide the listener "a little reprieve from some pain you felt in your life," adding that "lost love in any form can be extremely tough to deal with, but with a song like this you can find a way to start to find that closure and end to the pain".

Credits and personnel
Credits adapted from AllMusic.

 Matt Geroux – mixing, production, programming, recording
 Kevin Post – guitar
 Josh Ross – composition, primary vocals
 Ben Schuller – keyboards
 Dan Shike – master engineering
 Mason Thornley – composition

Music video
Ross filmed a live performance video of "First Taste of Gone" for the SiriusXM "Top of the Country" contest which premiered on August 31, 2022.

Charts

References

2022 songs
2022 singles
Josh Ross (singer) songs
Country ballads
Songs written by Josh Ross (singer)
Universal Music Canada singles